The 2018–19 Georgia State Panthers men's basketball team represents Georgia State University during the 2018–19 NCAA Division I men's basketball season. The team's head coach was Ron Hunter, who coached his eighth and final season at Georgia State. The Panthers play their home games at the GSU Sports Arena in Atlanta, Georgia as a member of the Sun Belt Conference. Finishing with a 13–5 conference record, GSU won its third Sun Belt regular season championship in the last six years. The Panthers defeated Texas State, and UT Arlington to become champions of the Sun Belt tournament. As a result, they received the Sun Belt's automatic bid to the NCAA tournament where they lost to Houston in the first round.

Previous season 
The Panthers finished the season 24–11, 12–6 in Sun Belt play to finish the regular season in second place. The Panthers defeated Troy, Georgia Southern, and UT Arlington to become champions of the Sun Belt tournament. As a result, they received the Sun Belt's automatic bid to the NCAA tournament. As the No. 15 seed in the West region, they lost to Cincinnati in the first round.

Offseason

Departures

Incoming transfers

2018 recruiting class

Roster

Source

Preseason
 Junior D'Marcus Simonds named to Preseason Mid-Major All-American first team by NBC Sports.
 Georgia State was unanimously picked as conference preseason favorite to win the Sun Belt Conference, receiving votes from all Sun Belt schools.
 D'Marcus Simonds was chosen as Preseason Player of the Year by the Sun Belt Conference.
 D'Marcus Simonds was chosen to the Sun Belt All-Conference Preseason First Team.
 Senior, Devin Mitchell, was chosen to the Sun Belt All-Conference Preseason Second Team.

Regular season
 The Panthers placed third in the Cayman Islands Classic after routing in-state rival Georgia by a score of 91–67. 
 GSU rallied from a 21-point deficit to beat the Alabama Crimson Tide, 83–80, in Tuscaloosa during non-conference play. As of February 22, 2019, GSU owns more SEC wins than UGA (1) and Vanderbilt (0) and as many as Missouri (2).
 Against Troy on February 13, Simonds became Georgia State's all-time leader in career made field goals.
 Seniors, Jeff Thomas and Devin Mitchell each hit their career 200th 3-pointers in the same game at Appalachian State on February 21.
On March 9, Georgia State completed a season sweep of in-state rival Georgia Southern, marking the rivalry's first away win since 1996. With the victory, the Panthers clinched their third Sun Belt regular season championship in six years.
 Junior, D'Marcus Simonds was selected as All-Conference First Team.

Post-season
 Senior, Malik Benveli was named Most Outstanding Player in the Sun Belt tournament.
 D'Marcus Simonds and Kane Williams were both named to the SBC All-Tournament Team.

Schedule and results

|-
!colspan=9 style=| Exhibition

|-
!colspan=9 style=| Non-conference regular season

|-
!colspan=9 style=| Sun Belt Conference regular season

|-
!colspan=9 style=| Sun Belt tournament

|-
!colspan=9 style=| NCAA tournament

References

Georgia State Panthers men's basketball seasons
Georgia State
Georgia State